Killing Time or Killin' Time may refer to:

 Killing time, the act of being idle
 The Killing Time, a period in late 17th century Scottish history

Art, entertainment, and media

Films 
(Chronological)
 Killing Time, a 1979 film directed by Fronza Woods
 Killing Time, a 1984 film nominated for a BAFTA Award for Best Short Film
 The Killing Time (film), a 1987 film starring Kiefer Sutherland
 Killing Time, a 1995 short film by Damian Harris starring Eric Stoltz
 Killing Time (1998 film), a British film by Bharat Nalluri
 Killing Time (2007 film), a documentary by Annika Gustafson about the Bhutanese refugees

Literature

Fiction 
(Alphabetical by author)
 Killing Time (Carr novel), a 2000 novel by Caleb Carr
 Killing Time (Star Trek novel), a 1985 Star Trek: The Original Series novel by Della van Hise
 Killing Time, a 1967 novel by Thomas Berger
 Killing Time, a 1988 novel by Robert J. Conley
 Killing Time, a 1996 Bill Slider mystery by Cynthia Harrod-Eagles
 Killing Time, a 2005 novel by Linda Howard
 Killing Time, a 2003 novel in the series The Invisible Detective by Justin Richards
 Killing Time, a 1961 novel by Donald Westlake

Non fiction 
(Alphabetical by title)
 Killing Time (book), a 1994 autobiography by Paul Feyerabend
 Killing Time: An Investigation into the Death-Row Case of Mumia Abu-Jamal, a 2003 book by Dave Lindorff
 Killing Time: Archaeology and the First World War, a 2007 book by Nicholas J. Saunders
 Killing Time: Life in the Arkansas Penitentiary, a 1977 photography book by Bruce Jackson
 Killing Time: The First Full Investigation into the Unsolved Murders of Nicole Brown Simpson and Ronald Goldman, a 1996 book by Donald Freed and Raymond P. Briggs
 The Killing Time: German U-Boats 1914-18, a 1972 book by Edwyn Gray

Poetry 
 Killing Time, a 1999 poetry collection by Simon Armitage

Music

Groups
 Killing Time (American band), a hardcore punk band
 Killing Time (Australian band), now known as Mantissa, a hard rock band

Albums
 Killin' Time (Clint Black album) or the title song (see below), 1989
 Killin' Time (Gasolin' album), or the title song, 1978
 Killing Time or the title song, by Sweet Savage, 1996
 Killing Time (Bayside album) or the title song, 2011
 Killing Time (Girl album) or the title song, 1987
 Killing Time (Massacre album) or the title song, 1981
 Killing Time (Mitchell Butel album), 2012 album by Mitchell Butel
 Killing Time (Tina Cousins album) or the title song, "Killin' Time" (see below), 1998

Songs
 "Killin' Time" (Clint Black song)
 "Killin' Time" (Tina Cousins song)
 "Killin' Time", by Fred Knoblock and Susan Anton
 "Killing Time" (Megadeth song)
 "Killing Time", by City and Colour from If I Should Go Before You
 "Killing Time", by Cold Chisel from Blood Moon, and covered by Jimmy Barnes in 2020.
 "Killing Time", by Destiny's Child from Destiny's Child
 "Killing Time", by Grave Digger from Tunes of War
 "Killing Time", by Hed PE from Broke
 "Killing Time", by Hollywood Rose from The Roots of Guns N' Roses
 "Killing Time", by Infected Mushroom from Legend of the Black Shawarma
 "Killing Time", by Joss Stone from Mind Body & Soul
 "Killing Time", by Maserati from Enter the Mirror
 "Killing Time", by Obituary from The End Complete
 "Killing Time", by Pennywise from About Time
 "Killing Time", by the Tragically Hip from The Tragically Hip
 "Killing Time", by Triumph from Thunder Seven

Television 
Series
 Killing Time (TV series), a 2011 Australian TV drama series
Episodes
 "Killing Time" (Beavis and Butt-head), an episode of Beavis and Butt-head
 "Killing Time" (Time Squad), an episode of Time Squad

Other art, entertainment, and media 
 Killing Time (video game), a 1995 first-person shooter originally for 3DO
 Killing Time, a video artwork by Sam Taylor-Wood